The following is a hierarchical outline for the Danish armed forces at the end of the Cold War. It is intended to convey the connections and relationships between units and formations. In wartime all Danish military units would have come under the joint West German/Danish NATO command Allied Forces Baltic Approaches (BALTAP). BALTAP was a principal subordinate command under the Allied Forces Northern Europe Command (AFNORTH). The commander-in-chief of (BALTAP) was always a Danish Lieutenant General or Vice Admiral, who had the designation Commander Allied Forces Baltic Approaches (COMBALTAP). In peacetime BALTAP had only a few communication units allocated and all other units remained under national command of West Germany's Bundeswehr and Denmark's Forsvaret.

Forsvaret 
Forsvaret (Danish Defence) was the unified armed forces of the Kingdom of Denmark, charged with the defence of Denmark and its overseas territories of Greenland and the Faroe Islands. Forsvaret had four service branches:

 Royal Danish Army
 Royal Danish Navy
 Royal Danish Air Force
 Danish Home Guard

The Forsvaret headquarters also had operational control of the following entities:

 Danish Defence Intelligence Service
 Dueodde SIGINT station, on Bornholm
 Royal Danish Defence College
 Judge Advocate Corps
 Lyngby Radio

Royal Danish Army 
The Royal Danish Army Command was based in Karup and tasked to train, maintain and prepare the army for war. However operational control in peacetime rested with the Western and the Eastern Regional Command. In wartime the former would have transferred its units to LANDJUT, while the latter would have become the LANDZEALAND command.

  Royal Danish Army, Karup
 Jaegerkorpset, at Aalborg Air Base, (Long range reconnaissance and special operations)
 Army Material Command, Hjørring
 Army Depot Service
 Army Maintenance Service
 Army Ammunition Arsenal

Western Regional Command 

The Western Regional Command was based in Aarhus and commanded by a major general. In case of war it would have transferred command of all its units to NATO's Commander, Allied Land Forces Schleswig-Holstein and Jutland (LANDJUT). The command was responsible for the South Jutland, Ribe, Vejle, Ringkjøbing, Viborg, North Jutland and Aarhus counties, which together form the Danish part of the Jutland peninsula, and also for the island of Funen, which with the surrounding islands formed the Funen County.

 Western Regional Command, Aarhus
 Jutland Division, Fredericia
 3rd Signal Battalion
 1st Jutland Brigade, Fredericia
 1st Brigade Staff Company (5x M113, 8x TOW on Land Rover)
 1st Battalion, Jydske Dragonregiment, (20x Leopard 1A3, 21x M113 (including 4 with TOW), 4x M125 mortar carriers, 2x TOW on Land Rover)
 1st Battalion, Kongens Jyske Fodregiment, (10x Leopard 1A3, 32x M113 (including 4 with TOW), 4x M125, 4x TOW on Land Rover)
 1st Battalion, Fynske Livregiment, (10x Leopard 1A3, 32x M113 (including 4 with TOW), 4x M125, 4x TOW on Land Rover)
 2nd Battalion, Kongens Jyske Fodregiment, (Light Infantry)
 6th Artillery Battalion, Nørrejyske Artilleriregiment, (12x M109A3 howitzer, 8x M114/39 155mm howitzer, 15x M113)
 1st Armoured Engineer Company (6 x M113)
 1st Logistic Battalion
 1st Military Police Detachment
 2nd Jutland Brigade, Skive
 2nd Brigade Staff Company (5x M113, 8x TOW on Land Rover)
 2nd Battalion, Jydske Dragonregiment, (20x Leopard 1A3, 21x M113 (including 4 with TOW), 2x M125)
 1st Battalion, Dronningens Livregiment, (10x Leopard 1A3, 32x M113 (including 4 with TOW), 4x M125, 4x TOW on Land Rover)
 2nd Battalion, Dronningens Livregiment, (10x Leopard 1A3, 32x M113 (including 4 with TOW), 4x M125, 4x TOW on Land Rover) 
 3rd Battalion, Dronningens Livregiment, (Light Infantry)
 3rd Artillery Battalion, Nørrejyske Artilleriregiment, (12x M109A3 howitzer, 8x M114/39 155mm howitzer)
 2nd Armoured Engineer Company
 3rd Logistic Battalion
 2nd Military Police Detachment
 3rd Jutland Brigade, Haderslev
 3rd Brigade Staff Company (5x M113, 8x TOW on Land Rover)
 3rd Battalion, Jydske Dragonregiment, (20x Leopard 1A3, 21x M113 (including 4 with TOW), 2x M125)
 1st Battalion, Prinsens Livregiment, (10x Leopard 1A3, 32x M113 (including 4 with TOW), 4x M125, 4x TOW on Land Rover)
 2nd Battalion, Prinsens Livregiment, (10x Leopard 1A3, 32x M113 (including 4 with TOW), 4x M125, 4x TOW on Land Rover)
 3rd Battalion, Prinsens Livregiment, (Light Infantry)
 7th Artillery Battalion, Sønderjyske Artilleriregiment, (12x M109A3 howitzer, 8x M114/39 howitzer)
 3rd Armoured Engineer Company
 7th Logistic Battalion
 3rd Military Police Detachment
 Divisional Artillery Regiment, Skive
 Staff and Target Acquisition Battery 
 23rd Artillery Battalion, (18x M114/39 155mm howitzer)
 24th Artillery Battalion, (18x M114/39 155mm howitzer)
 18th Heavy Battery, (4x M115 203mm howitzer)
 19th Heavy Battery, (4x M115 203mm howitzer)
 4th Battalion, Fynske Livregiment, (Light Infantry)
 5th Battalion, Jydske Dragonregiment, (Reconnaissance: 18x M41 DK-1, 9x M113, 9x M125)
 6th Battalion, Jydske Dragonregiment, (Tank destroyer Battalion: 50x Centurion Mk V (84mm gun))
 33rd Artillery Battalion, Skive, Nørrejyske Artilleriregiment (18x M59 155 mm gun, would have joined LANDJUT's Corps Artillery)
 14th Air Defence Battalion, (Stinger, Bofors 40 mm L/70)
 3rd Engineer Battalion
 8th Logistic Battalion
 Long Range Reconnaissance Company, Dronningens Livregiment
 Electronic Warfare Company
 Heavy Transport Company
 1st Military Police Company

Western Regional Command reserve units:
 Jutland Battle Group, Holstebro
 7th Staff Company
 4th Btn, Jydske Dragonregiment, (Armored) 
 1st Btn, Slesvigske Fodregiment, (Light Infantry)
 2nd Btn, Slesvigske Fodregiment, (Light Infantry)
 3rd Btn, Slesvigske Fodregiment, (Light Infantry)
 8th Artillery Btn, Nørrejyske Artilleriregiment, (6x M114/39 155 mm howitzer, 12x M101 105 mm howitzer)
 7th Engineer Company
 5th Logistic Battalion
 7th Military Police Detachment
 4th Artillery Battalion, Skive, Nørrejyske Artilleriregiment (24x M101 105mm howitzer, would have joined LANDJUT's Corps Artillery)
 10th Artillery Battalion, Varde, Sønderjyske Artilleriregiment  (24x M101 105mm howitzer, would have joined LANDJUT's Corps Artillery)
 11th Artillery Battalion, Varde, Sønderjyske Artilleriregiment  (24x M101 105mm howitzer, would have joined LANDJUT's Corps Artillery)
 5th Signal Battalion
 5th Engineer Battalion
 Host and Support Battalion (Supporting arrival of NATO reinforcements in Jutland and northern Germany)
 Rear and Sustainment Battalion  
 Logistics Support Group West (LSG-W)
 Supply Battalion
 Transport Battalion 
 Medical Battalion (incl. Medical Train)
 Maintenance Battalion 
 Field Replacement Commando

Eastern Regional Command 

The Eastern Regional Command was based in Ringsted and commanded by a major general, who in case of war would have become Commander, Allied Land Forces Zealand (LANDZEALAND). The command was responsible for the Copenhagen and Frederiksberg municipalities, and the Copenhagen, Frederiksborg, Roskilde, West Zealand and Storstrøm counties.

 Eastern Regional Command, Ringsted
 1st Signal Battalion
 1st Zealand Brigade
 4th Brigade Staff Company (5x M113, 8x TOW on Land Rover)
 1st Btn, Gardehusarregimentet, (30x Centurion (105mm L7 gun), 21 x M113 (including 4 with TOW), 2x M106)
 2nd Btn, Danske Livregiment, (10x Centurion (105mm L7 gun), 46x M113 (including 4 with TOW), 6x M106, 4 TOW on Land Rover)
 1st Btn, Den Kongelige Livgarde, (10x Centurion (105mm L7 gun), 46x M113 (including 4 with TOW), 6x M106, 4 TOW on Land Rover)
 4th Btn, Den Kongelige Livgarde, (Light Infantry)
 1st Btn, Kongens Artilleriregiment, (12x M109A3, 8x M114/39)
 4th  Armoured Engineer Company
 2nd Logistic Battalion 
 4th Military Police Detachment 
 2nd Zealand Brigade
 5th Brigade Staff Company (5x M113, 8x TOW on Land Rover)
 2nd Btn, Sjællandske Livregiment, (30x Centurion (105mm L7 gun), 21 x M113 (including 4 with TOW), 2x M106), 
 1st Btn, Danske Livregiment, (10x Centurion (105mm L7 gun), 46x M113 (including 4 with TOW), 6x M106, 4 TOW on Land Rover)
 1st Btn, Sjællandske Livregiment, (10x Centurion (105mm L7 gun), 46x M113 (including 4 with TOW), 6x M106, 4 TOW on Land Rover)
 5th Btn, Sjællandske Livregiment, (Light Infantry)
 5th Btn, Kongens Artilleriregiment, (12x M109A3, 8x M114/39)
 5th Armoured Engineer Company
 4th Logistic Battalion 
 5th Military Police Detachment
 Corps Artillery
 Staff and Target Acquisition Battery 
 2nd Artillery Battalion, (18x M114/39 155 mm howitzer)
 32nd Artillery Battalion, (18x M59 155 mm gun)
 17th Heavy Battery, (4x M115 203mm howitzer)
 3rd Btn, Gardehusarregimentet, (Reconnaissance: 18x M41 DK-1, 12x M113, 9x M106)
 4th Btn, Danske Livregiment, (Light Infantry)
 13th Air Defence Battalion, (Stinger)
 1st Engineer Battalion
 6th Logistic Battalion
 Electronic Warfare Company
 6th Military Police Company

Eastern Regional Command reserve units:
 1st Zealand Battle Group
 1st Antitank Squadron Gardehusarregimentet, (8x Centurion (84 mm gun))
 2nd Btn, Den Kongelige Livgarde, (Light Infantry)
 3rd Btn, Den Kongelige Livgarde, (Light Infantry)
 16th Artillery Battalion, (24x M101)
 2nd Zealand Battle Group
 2nd Antitank Squadron, Gardehusarregimentet, (8x Centurion(84 mm gun))
 2nd Btn, Gardehusarregimentet, (Light Infantry)
 4th Btn, Gardehusarregimentet, (Light Infantry)
 22nd Artillery Battalion, (24x M101)
 3rd Zealand Battle Group
 3rd Antitank Squadron Gardehusarregimentet, (8x Centurion(84 mm gun))
 3rd Btn, Danske Livregiment, (Light Infantry)
 5th Btn, Danske Livregiment, (Light Infantry)
 21st Artillery Battalion, (24x M101)
 4th Zealand Battle Group
 4th Antitank Squadron, Gardehusarregimentet, (8x Centurion(84 mm gun))
 3rd Btn, Sjællandske Livregiment, (Light Infantry)
 4th Btn, Sjællandske Livregiment, (Light Infantry)
 14th Artillery Battalion, (24x M101)
 Host and Support Battalion (Supporting arrival of NATO reinforcements on Zealand)
 Rear and Sustainment Battalion
 Logistics Support Group East (LSG-E)
 Supply Battalion
 Transport Company 
 Medical Battalion 
 Maintenance Battalion 
 Field Replacement Commando

Bornholms Værn 
In wartime the island of Bornholm was, due to the long distance from Zealand, an independent command. Furthermore, agreements signed after World War II forbade the stationing on Bornholm or reinforcing of Bornholm, by foreign troops. Therefore, the island was only guarded by one Battle Group with a single active light infantry battalion. However, during the transition to war this Battle Group would have been augmented and reinforced by local reservists.

 Bornholms Værn's Battle Group
 Staff and Signal Company
 1st Battalion, Bornholms Værn (infantry) (4x TOW on Land Rover)
 2nd Battalion, Bornholms Værn (infantry) (reserve) (4x TOW on Land Rover)
 3rd Battalion, Bornholms Værn (infantry) (reserve) (12 x 106 mm RR on Jeep M38)
 Light Tank Squadron, "Bornholm Dragoons" (10x M41 DK-1)
 Light Reconnaissance Squadron (6x M41 DK-1)
 12th Artillery Battalion (18x M101)
 Air Defence Battery (Stinger)
 Motorized Engineer Company
 Maintenance & Logistic Company

Royal Danish Army Aircraft Inventory 1989 
The inventory of the Royal Danish Army in 1989 consisted of the following aircraft:

 14x Hughes 500M, observation
 12x AS350 L1 Écureuil, armed with TOW anti-tank missiles
 8x T-17 Supporter, liaison and observation

Royal Danish Air Force 

The Royal Danish Air Force Command was headquartered at Karup Air Base and tasked to train, maintain and prepare the army for war. However operational control in peacetime rested with the Tactical Air Command. In wartime the air force's commander would have become the commander of Allied Air Forces Baltic Approaches (AIRBALTAP). AIRBALTAP commanded all flying units, flying reinforcements, all ground-based radar systems and stations, all air defence units and airfields in its sector. In war the entire Royal Danish Air Force would have come under AIRBALTAP.

In 1989 the Royal Danish Air Force consisted of the following units:

 Royal Danish Air Force, in Karup, commanded by a Danish lieutenant general
 Flyveskolen (Basic Flying School), Avnø Air Base, T-17 Supporter
 Air Force Materiel Command, Karup
 Air Force Depot Service
 Air Force Maintenance Service
 Air Force Ammunition Arsenal
 Tactical Air Command, Karup
 Aalborg Air Base
 Eskadrille 723, F-16A
 Eskadrille 726, F-16A
 Karup Air Base
 Eskadrille 725, F-35 Draken, TF-35 Draken
 Eskadrille 729, Reconnaissance, RF-35 Draken, TF-35 Draken
 Tirstrup Air Base
 Co-located Operating Base to be reinforced by U.S. Air Force / Royal Air Force squadrons 
 Vandel Air Base
 Co-located Operating Base to be reinforced by U.S. Air Force / Royal Air Force squadrons 
 Skrydstrup Air Base
 Eskadrille 727, F-16A
 Eskadrille 730, F-16A
 Værløse Air Base
 Eskadrille 721, Transport, C-130H Hercules, Gulfstream III
 Eskadrille 722, Search and rescue, S-61A helicopters
 Air Defence Command East, Skalstrup Air Station 
 Eskadrille 541, Stevns Fort, with 1x I-Hawk battery (6x launchers)
 Eskadrille 542, Kongelund Fort near Aflangshagen Air Station, with 1x I-Hawk battery (6x launchers)
 Eskadrille 543, Sigerslev Air Station, with 1x I-Hawk battery (6x launchers)
 Eskadrille 544, Tune near Skalstrup Air Station, with 1x I-Hawk battery (6x launchers)
 Air Defence Command West, Karup
 Eskadrille 531, Odense, with 1x I-Hawk battery (6x launchers)
 Eskadrille 532, Odense, with 1x I-Hawk battery (6x launchers)
 Eskadrille 533, Skrydstrup Air Base, with 1x I-Hawk battery (6x launchers)
 Eskadrille 534, Karup Air Base, with 1x I-Hawk battery (6x launchers)

Royal Danish Air Force Inventory 1989 
The inventory of the RDAF in 1989 consisted of the following aircraft:

 70x F-16A/B Falcon, fighter (last 12x delivered in 1989)
 16x F-35 Draken, fighter
 18x RF-35 Draken, reconnaissance
 9x TF-35 Draken, training
 3x C-130H Hercules, transport
 3x Gulfstream III, VIP
 8x S-61A Search and Rescue helicopters
 20x T-17 Supporter, training and liaison

Royal Danish Navy 

The Royal Danish Navy Command was based in Aarhus and tasked to train, maintain and prepare the navy for war. However operational command in peacetime rested with the Navy Operational Command. In war, the commander of the Royal Danish Navy would have come as "Flag Officer Denmark (FOD)" under the command of Allied Naval Forces Baltic Approaches (NAVBALTAP), which was commanded alternatingly by a Danish or German vice admiral. However Danish ships and units based in Greenland and the Faroe Islands would have come under command of NATO's Command Eastern Atlantic Area (EASTLANT), who would also have taken command of Island Command Greenland and Island Command Faroes.

Together with German Fleet under the Flag Officer Germany (FOG) the Royal Danish Navy would have tried to keep the Warsaw Pact's United Baltic Sea Fleets, consisting of the Soviet Baltic Fleet, Polish Navy and East German Volksmarine bottled up in the Baltic Sea by blocking the Danish straits and thus ensuring NATOs unchallenged control of the North Sea.  Additionally, NAVBALTAP was to prevent amphibious landings on the Danish coast. To fulfill its mission the navy fielded a large number of minelayers and fast attack crafts. The first would have been used to mine all sea lanes and potential landings beaches, while the latter would have harassed the enemy fleet with continuous hit and run attacks.

At the beginning of 1989 the Royal Danish Navy consisted of the following ships.

 Royal Danish Navy, in Aarhus, commanded by a vice admiral
 Navy Materiel Command, Aarhus
 Navy Depot Service
 Navy Maintenance Service
 Navy Ammunition Arsenal
 Frogman Corps, at Torpedo Station Kongsøre
 Sirius Dog Sled Patrol, Daneborg, Greenland
 Navy Operational Command, Aarhus
 Kattegat Marine District, Frederikshavn (Maritime Surveillance Center and tactical control of sea units)
 Bornholm Marine District, Rytterknægten (Maritime Surveillance Center and tactical control of sea units)
 Frigate Squadron
 Peder Skram-class frigates: F352 Peder Skram, F353 Herluf Trolle
 Niels Juel-class corvettes: F354 Niels Juel, F355 Olfert Fischer, F356 Peter Tordenskiold
 Daphne-class seaward defence vessels (in the process of being replaced by Flyvefisken-class patrol vessels): P530 Daphne, P531 Dryaden, P533 Havfruen, P534 Najaden, P535 Nymfen, P536 Neptun (decommissioned 30 October 30, 1989), P537 Ran, P538 Rota (decommissioned 31 October 1989)
  Oiler: A559 Sleipner
 Torpedo Boat Squadron
 Søløven-class fast torpedo boats (in the process of being replaced by Flyvefisken-class patrol vessels): P510 Søløven, P511 Søridderen, P512 Søbjørnen, P513 Søhesten, P514 Søhunden, P515 Søulven
 Willemoes-class fast missile boats: P540 Bille, P541 Bredal, P542 Hammer, P543 Huitfeldt, P544 Krieger, P545 Norby, P546 Rodsteen, P547 Sehested, P548 Suenson, P549 Willemoes
 Flyvefisken-class patrol vessel: P550 Flyvefisken (commissioned 19 December 1989)
 Oilers: A568 Rimfaxe, A569 Skinfaxe
 Land-based Mobile Base (MOBA) with approximately 40 trucks, which supplied fuel, ordnance, and freshwater, and provided repair facilities outside the naval bases to the torpedo boats. MOBA also had mobile radars for tactical surveillance and target acquisition, and 
 Submarine Squadron
 Narwhal-class submarines: S320 Narhvalen, S321 Nordkaperen
 Kobben-class submarine: S322 Tumleren (bought from Norway and commissioned on 20 October 1989)
 Dolphin-class submarines: S327 Spækhuggeren (decommissioned 31 July 1989), S329 Springeren
 Mine Vessels Squadron
 Lindormen-class cable minelayers: N43 Lindormen, N44 Lossen
 Falster-class minelayers: N80 Falster, N81 Fyen, N82 Møen, N83 Sjælland
 Sund-class minesweepers (in the process of being replaced by Flyvefisken-class patrol vessels): M572 Alssund (decommissioned 30 November 1989), M573 Egernsund (decommissioned 31 December 1989), M574 Grønsund, M575 Guldborgsund, M577 Ulvsund (had been refitted as a minehunter, decommissioned 31 December 1989), M578 Vilsund
 Fishery Protection Squadron
 Hvidbjørnen-class offshore patrol frigates: F348 Hvidbjørnen, F349 Vædderen, F350 Ingolf, F351 Fylla
 Beskytteren-class offshore patrol frigate: F340 Beskytteren
 Agdlek-class arctic patrol cutters: Y386 Agdlek, Y387 Agpa, Y388 Tulugaq
 Barsø-class naval patrol cutters: Y300 Barsø, Y301 Drejø, Y302 Romsø, Y303 Samsø, Y304 Thurø, Y305 Vejrø, Y306 Farø, Y307 Læsø, Y308 Rømø
 Danish Naval Air Squadron, Værløse Air Base (8x Lynx Mk.80 helicopters)
 Coastal artillery, with truck-mounted AGM-84 Harpoon anti-ship missiles

Navy Bases 
Main bases: 
 Holmen Naval Base
 Frederikshavn Naval Base 
 Korsor Naval Base

Minor naval bases: 
 Marine Station Aarhus (Danish Navy fleet command base)
 Marine Station Esbjerg (NATO reinforcements port)
 Marine Station Grønnedal in Greenland
 Marine Station Thorshavn in the Faroe Islands
 Torpedo Station Kongsøre (Frogman Corps and mine divers base) 
 Lyngsbæk Pier (Naval mines depot)

Coastal fortifications:
Stevnsfortet at the southern entrance to Øresund  
Langelandsfortet at the southern entrance to the Great Belt

Sea surveillance stations:
 Marine Station Møn
 Marine Station Gedser
 Marine Station Bornholm

Royal Danish Navy Aircraft Inventory 1989 
The inventory of the Royal Danish Navy in 1989 consisted of the following aircraft:

 1x Lynx 23
 6x Lynx 80
 2x Lynx 90

Home Guard 
The Danish Home Guard was a volunteer military organization in a permanent state of readiness. The task of the Home Guard was to support the armed forces. The Home Guard Command was based in Copenhagen and administered the home guard during peacetime. In case of war the home guard units would have reinforced the other three armed services.

Army Home Guard 
The Army Home Guard was commanded by a major general. Home guard units were tasked to secure and guard key infrastructure, and report and delay enemy infiltrations by air or sea in their area of operation. The Army Home Guard divided Denmark into seven territorial regions, which were each commanded by a Colonel.

 Army Home Guard
 Special Support and Reconnaissance, Haderslev Company (Long Range Reconnaissance Company for LANDZEALAND)
 1st Territorial Region (Northern Jutland), Aalborg, responsible for North Jutland County 
 4th Btn, Dronningens Livregiment, (Light Infantry)
 Tank Destroyer Squadron, Dronningens Livregiment, (8x Centurion Mk V (84 mm gun))
 15th Light Battery, (8x M101 105mm howitzer)
 Engineer Company
 6x Homeguard Districts
 6x Homeguard Staff Companies
 31x Area Companies
 6x Homeguard Military Police Companies
 2nd Territorial Region (Middle Jutland), Viborg, responsible for Viborg, Ringkjøbing and Aarhus counties
 4th Btn, Prinsens Livregiment, (Light Infantry)
 Tank Destroyer Squadron, Prinsens Livregiment, (8x Centurion Mk V (84 mm gun))  
 9th Light Battery, (8x M101 105mm howitzer) 
 Engineer Company
 10x Homeguard Districts
 10x Homeguard Staff Companies
 56x Area Companies
 10x Homeguard Military Police Companies
 3rd Territorial Region (Southern Jutland), Haderslev, responsible for the South Jutland, Ribe and Vejle counties
 4th Btn, Slesvigske Fodregiment, (Light Infantry)
 3rd Btn, Kongens Jyske Fodregiment, (Light Infantry)
 Tank Destroyer Squadron, Slesvigske Fodregiment, (8x Centurion Mk V (84 mm gun))
 Tank Destroyer Squadron, Kongens Jyske Fodregiment, (8x Centurion Mk V (84 mm gun))
 15th Artillery Battalion, (16x M101 105mm howitzer)
 Engineer Company
 11x Homeguard Districts
 11x Homeguard Staff companies
 53x Area Companies
 11x Homeguard Military Police Companies
 4th Territorial Region, Odense, responsible for Funen County
 2nd Btn, Fynske Livregiment, (Light Infantry)
 3rd Btn, Fynske Livregiment, (Light Infantry)
 1st Tank Destroyer Squadrons, Fynske Livregiment, (8x Centurion Mk V (84 mm gun))
 2nd Tank Destroyer Squadrons, Fynske Livregiment, (8x Centurion Mk V (84 mm gun))
 Artillery Battalion, (16x M101 105mm howitzer)
 Engineer Company
 5x Homeguard Districts
 5x Homeguard staff companies
 32x Area Companies
 5x Homeguard Military Police Companies
 5th Territorial Region (Zealand) in Ringsted, responsible for Roskilde, West Zealand and Storstrøm counties
 Engineer Company
 9x Homeguard Districts
 9x Homeguard Staff Companies
 50x Area Companies
 9x Homeguard Military Police Companies
 6th Territorial Region (Northern Zealand/Copenhagen) in Copenhagen, responsible for Copenhagen and Frederiksberg municipalities, and Copenhagen and Frederiksborg counties. Den Kongelige Livgarde and the Mounted Hussar Squadron were active units.
 Den Kongelige Livgarde (Infantry, in case of wartime upgrade to double battalion size and had 2x Heavy Mortar platoons (4x120 mm MT))
 Mounted Hussar Squadron, Gardehusarregimentet, (Infantry, in case of wartime upgrade to battalion size)
 Engineer Company
 4x Homeguard Districts (Northern Zealand)
 4x Homeguard Staff Companies
 29x Area Companies
 4x Homeguard Military Police Companies
  ? x Homeguard Districts (Copenhagen)
  ? x Homeguard Staff Company 
  ? x Area Company
  ? x Homeguard Military Police Company
 7th Territorial Region (Bornholm), responsible for Bornholm
 1x Homeguard District
 Homeguard Staff Company
 5x Homeguard Area Companies
 Homeguard Military Police Company

Air Force Home Guard 
The Air Force Home Guard would have provided additional ground and air defence personnel to the Air Force, and would have manned the co-located operating base at which U.S. Air Force reinforcement would have been based.

Naval Home Guard 
The Naval Home Guard (Marinehjemmeværnet (MHV)) was fielded a small number of ships for coastal surveillance.

 MH-90-class home guard cutters: MHV 90 Bopa, MHV 91 Brigaden, MHV 92 Holger Danske, MHV 93 Hvidsten, MHV 94 Ringen, MHV 95 Speditøren

References

Sources

Peter Monte, Die Rolle der Marine der Bundesrepublik Deutschland in der Verteidigungsplanung für Mittel- und Nordeuropa von den 50er Jahren bis zur Wende 1989/90; in: Werner Rahn (Hrsg.), Deutsche Marinen im Wandel, S. 565 ff.. München 2005. 
Norbert Rath; Headquarter Allied Forces Baltic Approaches (HQ BALTAP); in Marineforum 4-1997, S. 3ff.

Literature 
Thomas-Durell Young, Command in NATO After the Cold War: Alliance, National and Multinational Considerations

External links
 BALTAP

Military history of Denmark
Danish Armed Forces at the end of the Cold War